The 2022 Louisiana–Monroe Warhawks softball team represented the University of Louisiana at Monroe during the 2022 NCAA Division I softball season. The Warhawks played their home games at Geo-Surfaces Field at the ULM Softball Complex. The Warhawks were led by fourth-year head coach Molly Fichtner and were members of the Sun Belt Conference.

Preseason

Sun Belt Conference Coaches Poll
The Sun Belt Conference Coaches Poll was released on January 31, 2022. Louisiana–Monroe was picked to finish ninth in the conference with 27 votes.

Preseason All-Sun Belt team
No players from the Warhawks were chosen to the team.

National Softball Signing Day

Personnel

Schedule and results

Schedule Source:
*Rankings are based on the team's current ranking in the NFCA/USA Softball poll.

References

Louisiana–Monroe
Louisiana–Monroe Warhawks softball seasons
Louisiana–Monroe softball